Giovanni Battista Arnaud (Valgrana 1853 – Caraglio 1910) was a well renowned Italian painter of frescoes. He mastered as well, the chiaroscuro technique. His work can be found in many churches, palaces and public buildings in different regions of the north of Italy. As well in some churches of France and England. He is also recognized as a great portraitist.

Biography 
Giovanni Battista Arnaud was born January 12, 1853, in Valgrana, Cuneo province, Italy.

At the Accademia Albertina de Torino he learns with the great teachers Andrea Gastaldi and Enrico Gamba.
Most of his work as painter and "frescante" takes place in Italy, France and England, where his talent and artistic level is well recognized and appreciated throughout his extensive and varied artistic production.

In Italy he participates at the Cuneo Art Exhibition of 1898.

He carries out various works of fresco painting in several of Piedmont churches, such as the Maria Vergine Parish Church in Roccavione, the Church of San Giovanni Battista in Caraglio, the Sanctuary of San Mauro in Busca, the Santuario della Madonna della Divina Provvidenza in Peveragno, the Parish Church of San Martino in Valdieri, the Sanctuary of Bealetto in Entracque, and the San Pietro in Vincoli Parish in Limone Piemonte.

In Paesana, at the Santa Margherita Church, Giovanni Battista leaves his "Annunciazione", delicate canvas made in 1901. Here is to be found his "Matrimonio di Maria" as well. 
In most of these churches, one can see the high level reached in the realization of chiaroscuro pieces. Technique that he perfected and that earned him great recognition.

At the end of 1800 he carried out restoration work and painting of new frescoes at the Pallazzo Marchetti in Caraglio, the town where he lived most of his life. Work  commissioned by the "Garin di Cocconato" family, originally from Nice and owners of the palace at the time.

Regarding his facet as a portraitist, mostly stand out his works in the Council Room of Caraglio Municipality, where the portrait of King Umberto (Re Umberto) can be seen. Also the portrait made of Count Garin di Cocconato, and the portrait of the Engineer Sebastian Grandis, famous for having designed and directed in 1870, the works for the construction of the Frejus railway tunnel of more than 12 km between France and Italy, the first great tunnel in a mountain.

In France, he left his mark as a fresco painter in the Church of Selonnet, in the Alpes-de-Haute-Provence region.

In England, between the years 1885 and 1886, he carried out fresco and chiaroscuro works in London, at the St Peter's Italian Church. He also had the responsibility of supervising all artistic work on that project. The realization of frescoes is shared with the artist Francesco Gauthier, also from Piedmont, Italy. 

His oil paintings on canvas can be found at various churches in northern Italy. Part of this work is listed by the Diocese of Cuneo, as a religious artistic assets. Among these works stand out:

- Maddona della Neve (1888)

- Natività di Maria (1897)

- Presentazione al Tempio di Maria (1892)

- Sant'Anna insegna a leggere a Maria (1893)

- San Giuseppe da Leonessa (1904)

- Madonna col Bambino e santi (1905)

Giovanni Battista Arnaud died in Caraglio on January 9, 1910. His remains rest in the family pantheon in the cemetery of Caraglio. The pantheon is covered with frescoes, painted by the also painter and nephew, Giovanni Arnaud "junior".

Frescoes and chiaroscuros

Bibliography 

 COMANDUCCI, A. M.: Dizionario illustrato pitti e incisori italiani moderni. OVEM. Milán. 1945.
 Agostino Mario Comanducci (1891–1940): Italian critic and art historian.

 COMANDUCCI, A. M.: Dizionario illustrato dei pittori e incisori italiani moderni e contemporanei. Patuzzi. Milán. 1962.

 Dizionario Enciclopedico Bolaffi dei pittori e degli incisori italiani dall'XI al XX secolo; Vol. 1: Abacco-Bellori. Turín. 1972.
 Giulio Bolaffi: italian editor .

 Thieme-Becker: Allgemeines Lexikon der bildenden Künstler. Leipzig. Ed. de 1992.
 Full Title: Allgemeines Lexikon der bildenden Künstler von der Antike bis zur Gegenwart (General dictionary of visual artists from antiquity to today).
 Ulrich Thieme (1865–1922): German art historian, and grandfather of the painter Peter Flinsch; he was editor of volumes I to XV.
 Felix Becker (Karl Günther Ernst Felix Becker, 1864 – 1928): German art historian; he was editor of volumes I to IV.

 "St Peter's Italian Church in London". Luca Mateo Stanca. (English translation by Michael Coffey)
 Original Title: "La Chiesa Italiana di San Pietro a Londra". First Edition, July 2001. Printed by Salemi Pro. Edit, Rome.

 "Arte nel territorio diocesi di Saluzzo di Allemano Romano". Sonia Damiano, Giovanna Galante Garrone. Saluzzo 2008. SKU: 9788873202080.

References

External links 
Pallazzo Marchetti/Garin di Coconnato (pages 16, 34-35)
Galleria di Arte Recta
Peveragno. Santuario della Madonna della Divina Provvidenza
Maria Vergine Parish Church in Roccavione
Parish Church in Limone Piemonte
Church of Santa Margherita. Paesana, Italy.
Saint Peter's Church. London. (pages 44-50)
Busca. San Mauro Sanctuary. (page 20-21 , 36-51) 
Historic and artistic heritage. Diocese of Cuneo. Italy

19th-century Italian painters
Fresco painting
Italian art
1853 births
1910 deaths
People from the Province of Cuneo